In the Fishtank 6 is the recording of a live session in a Dutch studio by Louisville-based math rock band June of 44.

Track listing
 "Pregenerate" (4:18)
 "Generate" (4:18)
 "Henry's Revenge"  (3:27)
 "Modern Hereditary Dance Steps" (5:36)
 "Every Free Day A Good Day" (4:06)
 "Degenerate" (6:07)

Personnel
Fred Erskine – bass, trumpet, keyboard, vocals
Sean Meadows – guitar, bass, vocals
Jeff Mueller – guitar, vocals
Doug Scharin – drums, keyboards, samples, percussion, vibes
Mastered and engineer by Zlaya

References

1999 albums
June of 44 albums
06